~Anhui Ankai Automobile Co., Ltd. is a Chinese automotive manufacturing company headquartered in Hefei, Anhui which specialises in the production of buses and coaches. Ankai's products include urban buses, regular coaches, sleeping berth coaches, bus and coach chassis and automotive components. Ankai also offers related repair and maintenance services. The company has three principal subsidiaries and distributes its products worldwide.

The name "Ankai" is the abbreviation of Anhui-Kässbohrer, marking the cooperation between Hefei Feihe Automobile Factory and Kässbohrer from 1993.

As at 9 November 2016, Ankai was a constituent of SZSE 1000 Index (as well as sub-index SZSE 700 Index) but not in SZSE Component Index, making the company was ranked between the 501st to 1,000th by free float adjusted market capitalization.

History 
Anhui Ankai Automobile Co., Ltd was founded on July 22, 1997 and was listed on the Shenzhen Stock Exchange, China's second largest stock exchange, three days later. A license agreement for the construction of buses with a self-supporting body was signed with the Setra bus brand, which now belongs to the Daimler subsidiary EvoBus. This made Ankai the first company in Asia to produce this type of body, also known as a monocoque. Just one year later, in November 1998, the 500th bus was manufactured.

In 2001, the license agreement with EvoBus was extended for a further ten years. The contract allowed Ankai to produce the SETRA S 315 coach model, winner of the Coach of the Year award. In the same year, construction of a new automobile factory in Hefei began. With an initial production capacity of 1,000 vehicles per year, the largest production facility for comfort buses in China was created. Licensed production of the S 315 under the name Ankai Setra HFF6120K35(S315) began as early as November 2002. In the years that followed, Ankai played a key role in building the nationwide long-distance bus network with modern vehicles that meet western comfort and safety standards. In September 2002, scheduled bus services from Inner Mongolia to the capital Beijing began using Ankai-Setra buses. This also represented one of the first fast and comfortable long-distance bus routes in China.

In March 2008, an Ankai bus (the first Chinese bus manufacturer) received safety and environmental certification from the Australian Transport Authority. This certificate, which largely corresponds to the demanding requirements of the ECE regulations, meant a decisive step for the further development of the company: It enabled access to the lucrative European markets, which are, however, heavily regulated in terms of technical specifications. Another milestone in the company's history was the sale of 11 Ankai double-decker buses to the Big Bus Company in June 2010. It was the first time that buses from China entered the US market; this was preceded by lengthy negotiations with the approval and import authorities. The unit price was RMB 2 million. The buses were painted with oversized USA flags and are used as tourist buses in Las Vegas and San Francisco. In the same year, double-decker buses were sold on the South African market, which had previously been dominated by British models.

In 2022, Ankai partnered with JAC Motors and BYD to build a power battery plant.

Products
Buses:
A5
A6
A8
A9
Baositong K7
K8
F7
G7
G9
N7
School bus:
S6
S7
S9
EV buses and vans:
G6
G7
G9
A6
K7
E6
E9
T3/ Kuaileyun (快乐运) 
T5

Gallery

See also
Setra

References

External links
Official website

Bus manufacturers of China
Manufacturing companies based in Hefei
Vehicle manufacturing companies established in 1997
Companies listed on the Shenzhen Stock Exchange
Chinese brands